This is a comprehensive list of the vascular plants of the Karelian Isthmus, a land mass in Russia connected to Finland on one side and otherwise surrounded by three bodies of water: the Gulf of Finland, the Neva River, and Lake Ladoga.

Pteridophyta

Aspleniaceae

Asplenium septentrionale - rare
Asplenium trichomanes - rare

Athyriaceae

Athyrium filix-femina – common
Cystopteris fragilis - rare
Diplazium sibiricum – rare
Gymnocarpium dryopteris - common

Botrychiaceae

Botrychium lanceolatum - rare 
Botrychium lunaria
Botrychium matricariifolium - rare
Botrychium multifidum
Botrychium simplex - rare
Botrychium virginianum - rare

Dennstaedtiaceae

Pteridium aquilinum - common

Dryopteridaceae

Dryopteris carthusiana - common
Dryopteris cristata
Dryopteris expansa - common
Dryopteris filix-mas - common

Equisetaceae

Equisetum arvense - common
Equisetum fluviatile - common
Equisetum hyemale - common
Equisetum × litorale
Equisetum palustre - common
Equisetum pratense - common
Equisetum sylvaticum - common
Equisetum variegatum

Onocleaceae

Matteuccia struthiopteris – common

Ophioglossaceae

Ophioglossum vulgatum

Polypodiaceae

Polypodium vulgare

Thelypteridaceae

Phegopteris connectilis - common
Thelypteris palustris

Woodsiaceae

Woodsia ilvensis

Lycopodiophyta

Huperziaceae

Huperzia selago - common

Isoetaceae

Isoetes echinospora
Isoetes lacustris

Lycopodiaceae

Diphasiastrum complanatum - common
Diphasiastrum tristachyum
Diphasiastrum × zeileri
Lycopodiella inundata
Lycopodium annotinum - common
Lycopodium clavatum - common

Selaginellaceae

Selaginella selaginoides - extinct

Pinophyta

Cupressaceae

Juniperus communis - common

Pinaceae

Pinus sylvestris - common
Picea abies - common
Picea × fennica

Magnoliophyta

Liliopsida

Alismataceae
Alisma gramineum - rare
Alisma × juzepczukii - rare
Alisma plantago-aquatica - common
Alisma wahlenbergii
Sagittaria sagittifolia - common

Alliaceae
Allium angulosum - rare
Allium oleraceum
Allium schoenoprasum

Araceae
Calla palustris - common
Spirodela polyrhiza - common

Butomaceae
Butomus umbellatus

Cyperaceae
Blysmus rufus
Bolboschoenus maritimus
Carex acuta - common
Carex acutiformis - rare
Carex appropinquata - rare
Carex aquatilis - rare
Carex arenaria
Carex atherodes - rare
Carex bergrothii - rare
Carex bohemica - rare
Carex brunnescens - common
Carex buxbaumii - rare
Carex canescens - common
Carex caryophyllea - extinct
Carex cespitosa - common
Carex chordorrhiza - common
Carex contigua - rare
Carex diandra - common
Carex digitata
Carex dioica
Carex disperma - common
Carex disticha - rare
Carex echinata - common
Carex elata - rare
Carex elongata - common
Carex ericetorum - common
Carex flava - common
Carex glareosa - rare
Carex globularis - common
Carex hartmanii - rare
Carex heleonastes - rare
Carex hirta - common
Carex juncella - common
Carex lasiocarpa - common
Carex lepidocarpa - rare
Carex leporina - common
Carex limosa - common
Carex livida - rare
Carex loliacea
Carex mackenziei - rare
Carex muricata - rare
Carex nigra - common
Carex omskiana - rare
Carex otrubae - rare
Carex pallescens - common
Carex panicea - common
Carex paniculata - rare
Carex pauciflora - common
Carex paupercula - common
Carex pilulifera
Carex praecox - introduced, rare
Carex pseudocyperus - common
Carex rhynchophysa
Carex riparia - rare
Carex rostrata - common
Carex scandinavica - rare
Carex serotina
Carex sylvatica - rare
Carex vaginata - common
Carex vesicaria - common
Carex vulpina - rare
Eleocharis acicularis - common
Eleocharis fennica
Eleocharis mamillata
Eleocharis palustris - common
Eleocharis parvula - rare
Eleocharis quinqueflora - rare
Eriophorum angustifolium - common
Eriophorum gracile
Eriophorum latifolium
Eriophorum vaginatum - common
Rhynchospora alba
Rhynchospora fusca - rare
Scirpus lacustris - common
Scirpus radicans
Scirpus sylvaticus - common
Scirpus tabernaemontani
Trichophorum alpinum
Trichophorum cespitosum - rare

Hydrocharitaceae
Caulinia tenuissima - rare
Elodea canadensis - introduced, common
Hydrocharis morsus-ranae - common
Najas marina - rare
Stratiotes aloides - common

Iridaceae
Iris pseudacorus - common

Juncaceae
Juncus alpinoarticulatus - common
Juncus articulatus - common
Juncus balticus
Juncus bufonius - common
Juncus bulbosus
Juncus capitatus - extinct
Juncus compressus - common
Juncus conglomeratus - common
Juncus effusus - common
Juncus filiformis - common
Juncus fischerianus - rare
Juncus gerardii
Juncus hylanderi - rare
Juncus nastanthus - common
Juncus nodulosus - common
Juncus ranarius - common
Juncus squarrosus
Juncus stygius - rare
Juncus tenuis - introduced, common
Luzula campestris - rare
Luzula multiflora - common
Luzula pallidula - common
Luzula pilosa - common

Juncaginaceae
Triglochin maritimum
Triglochin palustris - common

Lemnaceae
Lemna gibba - rare
Lemna minor - common
Lemna trisulca - common

Liliaceae
Gagea lutea - rare
Gagea minima

Orchidaceae
Calypso bulbosa - extinct
Coeloglossum viride - rare
Corallorhiza trifida
Cypripedium calceolus - extinct
Dactylorhiza baltica - rare
Dactylorhiza fuchsii - common
Dactylorhiza incarnata
Dactylorhiza maculata - common
Dactylorhiza traunsteineri - rare
Epipactis atrorubens - rare
Epipactis helleborine
Epipactis palustris - rare
Epipogium aphyllum - rare
Goodyera repens - common
Gymnadenia conopsea
Neottia cordata - rare
Neottia ovata
Malaxis monophyllos - rare
Malaxis paludosa
Neottia nidus-avis
Platanthera bifolia
Platanthera chlorantha - rare

Poaceae
Agropyron pectinatum - introduced, rare
Agrostis canina - common
Agrostis capillaris - common
Agrostis gigantea - common
Agrostis stolonifera - common
Agrostis straminea
Alopecurus aequalis - common
Alopecurus arundinaceus - rare
Alopecurus geniculatus - common
Alopecurus pratensis - common
Anisantha tectorum - introduced, rare
Anthoxanthum odoratum - common
Apera spica-venti
Arrhenatherum elatius - introduced, rare
Avena fatua - introduced, rare
Avena strigosa - introduced
Brachypodium pinnatum - rare
Briza media - common
Bromus inermis - common
Bromus mollis - introduced
Calamagrostis arundinacea - common
Calamagrostis canescens - common
Calamagrostis epigeios - common
Calamagrostis meinshausenii - common
Calamagrostis neglecta - common
Calamagrostis phragmitoides - common
Calamagrostis purpurea - rare
Catabrosa aquatica - rare
Cinna latifolia - rare
Dactylis glomerata - common
Dactylis polygama - introduced, rare
Deschampsia cespitosa - common
Deschampsia flexuosa - common
Echinochloa crusgalli - introduced
Elymus caninus - common
Elytrigia repens - common
Festuca arenaria - rare
Festuca brevipila - rare
Festuca gigantea
Festuca ovina - common
Festuca polesica - rare
Festuca pratensis - common
Festuca rubra - common
Festuca sabulosa
Glyceria fluitans - common
Glyceria lithuanica - rare
Glyceria maxima - common
Glyceria notata - common
Helictotrichon pubescens
Hierochloe arctica - common
Hierochloe australis - rare
Hierochloe baltica - common
Hierochloe hirta - rare
Holcus mollis
Koeleria delavignei - introduced, rare
Koeleria glauca - introduced, rare
Leersia oryzoides
Leymus arenarius
Melica nutans - common
Melica picta - rare
Milium effusum - common
Molinia caerulea - common
Nardus stricta
Panicum miliaceum - introduced, rare
Phalaris arundinacea - common
Phalaris canariensis - introduced, rare
Phleum pratense - common
Phragmites australis - common
Poa angustifolia - common
Poa annua - common
Poa compressa - common
Poa humilis - common
Poa nemoralis - common
Poa palustris - common
Poa pratensis - common
Poa remota
Poa supina - introduced, rare
Poa trivialis - common
Puccinellia distans - introduced
Puccinellia hauptiana - introduced, rare
Puccinellia pulvinata - rare
Scolochloa festucacea
Setaria faberi - introduced, rare
Setaria pumila - introduced, rare
Setaria pycnocoma - introduced, rare
Setaria viridis - introduced
Sieglingia decumbens

Potamogetonaceae
Potamogeton alpinus - common
Potamogeton berchtoldii - common
Potamogeton compressus - common
Potamogeton crispus - rare
Potamogeton filiformis - rare
Potamogeton friesii - rare
Potamogeton gramineus - common
Potamogeton lucens - common
Potamogeton natans - common
Potamogeton obtusifolius
Potamogeton pectinatus - common
Potamogeton perfoliatus - common
Potamogeton praelongus - rare
Potamogeton pusillus
Potamogeton rutilus - rare
Potamogeton trichoides - rare
Zannichellia palustris

Ruppiaceae
Ruppia brachypus - rare

Ruscaceae
Convallaria majalis - common
Maianthemum bifolium - common
Polygonatum multiflorum
Polygonatum odoratum - common

Scheuchzeriaceae
Scheuchzeria palustris - common

Sparganiaceae
Sparganium angustifolium
Sparganium emersum - common
Sparganium glomeratum
Sparganium gramineum
Sparganium microcarpum - common
Sparganium minimum - common

Trilliaceae
Paris quadrifolia - common

Typhaceae
Typha angustifolia
Typha latifolia - common

Magnoliopsida

Aceraceae
Acer platanoides

Adoxaceae
Adoxa moschatellina
Viburnum opulus - common

Amaranthaceae
Amaranthus retroflexus - introduced, rare
Atriplex calotheca - rare
Atriplex littoralis
Atriplex longipes - rare
Atriplex patula - introduced, common
Atriplex prostrata - common
Atriplex sagittata - introduced
Chenopodium album - introduced, common
Chenopodium glaucum - introduced, common
Chenopodium polyspermum - introduced
Chenopodium rubrum - introduced, common
Chenopodium suecicum - introduced
Corispermum membranaceum - introduced, rare
Salsola kali

Apiaceae
Aegopodium podagraria - common
Angelica sylvestris - common
Anthriscus sylvestris - common
Archangelica litoralis
Carum carvi - common
Chaerophyllum aromaticum - rare
Chaerophyllum aureum - introduced, rare
Cicuta virosa - common
Conioselinum tataricum - rare
Conium maculatum - introduced
Heracleum sibiricum - common
Heracleum sphondylium - introduced, rare
Kadenia dubia - rare
Oenanthe aquatica
Pastinaca sativa - introduced
Pimpinella saxifraga - common
Selinum carvifolia
Sium latifolium
Thyselium palustre - common

Aristolochiaceae
Asarum europaeum - rare

Asteraceae
Achillea millefolium - common
Antennaria dioica - common
Anthemis arvensis - introduced
Anthemis tinctoria - introduced
Arctium lappa - introduced, rare
Arctium minus - introduced
Arctium tomentosum - introduced, common
Artemisia absinthium - introduced
Artemisia austriaca - introduced, rare
Artemisia campestris - common
Artemisia pontica - introduced, rare
Artemisia sieversiana - introduced, rare
Artemisia vulgaris - common
Bidens cernua
Bidens radiata
Bidens tripartita - common
Carduus crispus - common
Carlina fennica
Centaurea cyanus - introduced
Centaurea diffusa - introduced, rare
Centaurea jacea - common
Centaurea phrygia - common
Centaurea scabiosa - common
Cichorium intybus - introduced
Cirsium arvense - common
Cirsium heterophyllum - common
Cirsium oleraceum
Cirsium palustre - common
Cirsium vulgare - introduced, common
Conyza canadensis - introduced, common
Crepis czerepanovii - rare
Crepis paludosa - common
Crepis tectorum - common
Erigeron acris - common
Erigeron droebachiensis - introduced, rare
Eupatorium cannabinum - rare
Filago arvensis - common
Galinsoga ciliata - introduced, rare
Galinsoga parviflora - introduced, rare
Gnaphalium pilulare - rare
Gnaphalium uliginosum - common
Hieracium aggr. aestivum:
Hieracium ahtii  - rare
Hieracium reticulatum - rare
Hieracium aggr. bifidum:
Hieracium chlorellum - rare
Hieracium crispulum - rare
Hieracium prolixum - rare
Hieracium triangulare - rare
Hieracium aggr. caesiomurorum:
Hieracium caesiomurorum - rare
Hieracium fulvescens - rare
Hieracium aggr. caesium:
Hieracium caesium - rare
Hieracium coniops - rare
Hieracium laeticolor - rare
Hieracium plumbeum - rare
Hieracium ravidum
Hieracium aggr. diaphanoides:
Hieracium caespiticola - rare
Hieracium chloromaurum - rare
Hieracium diaphanoides - rare
Hieracium pseudopellucidum - rare
Hieracium silenii
Hieracium subpellucidum
Hieracium aggr. fuscocinereum:
Hieracium godbyense - rare
Hieracium oistophyllum - rare
Hieracium penduliforme - rare
Hieracium philanthrax
Hieracium karelorum
Hieracium aggr. kuusamoense:
Hieracium prolatatum - rare
Hieracium aggr. laevigatum:
Hieracium laevigatum
Hieracium lissolepium - rare
Hieracium tridentatum - rare
Hieracium aggr. murorum:
Hieracium dispansiforme   - rare
Hieracium distendens
Hieracium hjeltii - rare
Hieracium lepistoides
Hieracium morulum
Hieracium patale
Hieracium pellucidum - rare
Hieracium praetenerum
Hieracium subcaesium
Hieracium submarginellum
Hieracium aggr. umbellatum:
Hieracium umbellatum - common
Hieracium aggr. vulgatum:
Hieracium diversifolium
Hieracium incurrens
Hieracium vulgatum - common
Inula britannica
Inula salicina
Lactuca serriola - introduced, rare
Lactuca sibirica
Lactuca tatarica - introduced, rare
Lapsana communis - introduced, common
Leontodon autumnalis - common
Leontodon hispidus - common
Lepidotheca suaveolens - introduced, common
Leucanthemum vulgare - common
Ligularia sibirica - extinct
Matricaria recutita - introduced, rare
Mycelis muralis - rare
Omalotheca sylvatica - common
Phalacroloma strigosum - introduced
Picris hieracioides
Pilosella caespitosa
Pilosella cymella  
Pilosella × floribunda - common
Pilosella lactucella - rare
Pilosella officinarum - common
Pilosella onegensis
Pilosella praealta
Ptarmica vulgaris - common
Scorzonera humilis
Senecio aquaticus - rare
Senecio jacobaea - introduced, rare
Senecio paludosus - rare
Senecio sylvaticus - introduced, rare
Senecio viscosus - common
Senecio vulgaris - introduced, common
Solidago virgaurea - common
Sonchus arvensis - introduced, common
Sonchus asper - introduced
Sonchus humilis - rare
Sonchus oleraceus - introduced, common
Tanacetum vulgare - common
Taraxacum officinale - common
Tragopogon pratensis - introduced
Tripleurospermum maritimum - rare
Tripleurospermum perforatum - introduced, common
Tripleurospermum subpolare
Tripolium vulgare - rare
Trommsdorffia maculata - common
Tussilago farfara - common

Balsaminaceae
Impatiens noli-tangere - common
Impatiens parviflora - introduced, common

Betulaceae
Alnus glutinosa - common
Alnus incana - common
Betula nana
Betula pendula - common
Betula pubescens - common
Corylus avellana

Boraginaceae
Anchusa officinalis - introduced
Buglossoides arvensis - introduced, rare
Cynoglossum officinale - introduced, rare
Echium vulgare - introduced
Lappula squarrosa - introduced
Lycopsis arvensis - introduced, rare
Myosotis arvensis - introduced, common
Myosotis caespitosa - common
Myosotis micrantha - common
Myosotis palustris - common
Myosotis ramosissima - rare
Myosotis sparsiflora - common
Pulmonaria obscura
Symphytum officinale - common

Brassicaceae
Alliaria petiolata – introduced, rare
Alyssum alyssoides – introduced, rare
Arabidopsis × suecica
Arabidopsis thaliana – common
Barbarea arcuata – common
Barbarea stricta – common
Berteroa incana – introduced, common
Brassica campestris – introduced, common
Bunias orientalis – introduced, common
Cakile baltica
Camelina microcarpa – introduced, rare
Camelina sylvestris – introduced, rare
Capsella bursa-pastoris – introduced, common
Cardamine amara – common
Cardamine dentata – common
Cardamine parviflora – rare
Cardamine pratensis
Cardaminopsis arenosa – common
Dentaria bulbifera – rare
Descurainia sophia – introduced, common
Diplotaxis muralis – introduced, rare
Draba incana – rare
Draba nemorosa
Erophila verna
Erucastrum gallicum – introduced, rare
Erysimum canescens – introduced, rare
Erysimum cheiranthoides – introduced, common
Erysimum cuspidatum
Isatis tinctoria
Lepidium campestre – introduced, rare
Lepidium densiflorum – introduced, common
Lepidium latifolium – introduced, rare
Lepidium ruderale – introduced, common
Neslia paniculata – introduced
Raphanus raphanistrum – introduced, common
Rorippa × armoracioides – introduced, rare
Rorippa amphibia – rare
Rorippa austriaca – introduced, rare
Rorippa palustris – common
Rorippa sylvestris – common
Sinapis arvensis – introduced
Sisymbrium altissimum – introduced
Sisymbrium loeselii – introduced
Sisymbrium officinale – introduced, common
Sisymbrium wolgense – introduced, rare
Subularia aquatica
Thlaspi alpestre – introduced
Thlaspi arvense – introduced, common
Turritis glabra – common

Campanulaceae
Campanula cervicaria
Campanula glomerata - common
Campanula latifolia
Campanula patula - common
Campanula persicifolia - common
Campanula rapunculoides - introduced
Campanula rotundifolia - common
Campanula trachelium
Jasione montana

Cannabaceae
Humulus lupulus - common
Cannabis ruderalis - introduced, rare

Caprifoliaceae
Linnaea borealis - common
Lonicera xylosteum - common

Caryophyllaceae
Arenaria serpyllifolia
Cerastium arvense - common
Cerastium holosteoides - common
Coccyganthe flos-cuculi - common
Dianthus arenarius
Dianthus deltoides - common
Gypsophila fastigiata - rare
Herniaria glabra
Honckenya peploides
Melandrium album - introduced, common
Melandrium dioicum - common
Moehringia trinervia - common
Myosoton aquaticum
Oberna behen - common
Psammophiliella muralis   introduced
Sagina nodosa
Sagina procumbens - common
Scleranthus annuus - common
Scleranthus perennis - rare
Silene nutans - common
Silene rupestris - rare
Silene tatarica - introduced, rare
Spergula arvensis - introduced, common
Spergula morisonii
Spergularia marina - rare
Spergularia rubra - common
Stellaria alsine
Stellaria crassifolia - rare
Stellaria graminea - common
Stellaria holostea - common
Stellaria longifolia
Stellaria media - common
Stellaria nemorum - common
Stellaria palustris - common
Viscaria alpina
Viscaria viscosa - common

Ceratophyllaceae
Ceratophyllum demersum - common

Clusiaceae
Hypericum maculatum - common
Hypericum perforatum - common

Convolvulaceae
Calystegia sepium - common
Convolvulus arvensis - introduced, common
Cuscuta europaea
Cuscuta halophyta - rare

Cornaceae
Cornus suecica

Crassulaceae
Hylotelephium decumbens - common
Hylotelephium triphyllum - common
Sedum acre - common
Tillaea aquatica

Dipsacaceae
Knautia arvensis - common
Succisa pratensis - common

Droseraceae
Drosera anglica - common
Drosera intermedia - rare
Drosera × obovata - common
Drosera rotundifolia - common

Elatinaceae
Elatine hydropiper
Elatine orthosperma - extinct
Elatine triandra

Ericaceae
Andromeda polifolia - common
Arctostaphylos uva-ursi - common
Calluna vulgaris - common
Chamaedaphne calyculata - common
Chimaphila umbellata
Empetrum hermaphroditum
Empetrum nigrum - common
Empetrum subholarcticum
Hypopitys monotropa - common
Ledum palustre - common
Moneses uniflora
Orthilia secunda - common
Oxycoccus microcarpus
Oxycoccus palustris - common
Pyrola chlorantha
Pyrola media
Pyrola minor - common
Pyrola rotundifolia - common
Vaccinium myrtillus - common
Vaccinium uliginosum - common
Vaccinium vitis-idaea - common

Euphorbiaceae
Euphorbia esula - rare
Euphorbia helioscopia - introduced, rare
Euphorbia palustris
Euphorbia seguieriana - introduced, rare
Euphorbia virgata - introduced, common
Mercurialis perennis - rare

Fabaceae
Anthyllis colorata - introduced, rare
Anthyllis macrocephala - introduced, rare
Astragalus danicus - introduced, rare
Astragalus subpolaris - rare
Chrysaspis aurea - common
Chrysaspis campestris - introduced, rare
Chrysaspis spadicea - common
Lathyrus linifolius - rare
Lathyrus maritimus
Lathyrus palustris
Lathyrus pisiformis - introduced, rare
Lathyrus pratensis - common
Lathyrus sylvestris - common
Lathyrus tuberosus - introduced, rare
Lathyrus vernus - common
Lotus ambiguus - introduced, common
Lotus callunetorum - common
Lotus corniculatus - introduced, common
Lotus ruprechtii
Medicago falcata - introduced
Medicago lupulina - introduced, common
Melilotus albus - introduced, common
Melilotus officinalis - introduced, common
Ononis repens - introduced
Oxytropis sordida - rare
Securigera varia - introduced, rare
Trifolium arvense - common
Trifolium hybridum - introduced, common
Trifolium medium - common
Trifolium montanum - introduced, rare
Trifolium pratense - common
Trifolium repens - common
Vicia angustifolia - introduced
Vicia biennis - introduced, rare
Vicia cracca - common
Vicia hirsuta - introduced
Vicia sepium - common
Vicia sylvatica - common
Vicia tetrasperma - introduced
Vicia villosa - introduced, rare

Fagaceae
Quercus robur

Fumariaceae
Corydalis intermedia - rare
Corydalis solida
Fumaria officinalis - introduced, common

Gentianaceae
Centaurium erythraea - rare
Centaurium littorale
Centaurium pulchellum - rare
Gentiana pneumonanthe - rare
Gentianella amarella - rare
Gentianella campestris - rare

Geraniaceae
Erodium cicutarium - introduced
Geranium bohemicum - rare
Geranium palustre
Geranium pratense - common
Geranium robertianum
Geranium sibiricum - introduced, rare
Geranium sylvaticum - common

Grossulariaceae
Ribes alpinum
Ribes nigrum - common
Ribes spicatum - common

Haloragaceae
Myriophyllum alterniflorum
Myriophyllum sibiricum - common
Myriophyllum spicatum - rare
Myriophyllum verticillatum - common

Lamiaceae
Acinos arvensis
Ajuga pyramidalis
Ajuga reptans
Betonica officinalis - introduced, rare
Clinopodium vulgare - common
Dracocephalum thymiflorum - introduced, rare
Galeobdolon luteum
Galeopsis bifida - introduced, common
Galeopsis ladanum - introduced
Galeopsis speciosa - introduced, common
Galeopsis tetrahit - introduced, common
Glechoma hederacea - common
Lamium album - introduced, common
Lamium hybridum - introduced
Lamium purpureum - introduced, common
Leonurus cardiaca - introduced, rare
Lycopus europaeus - common
Mentha aquatica - rare
Mentha arvensis - common
Prunella vulgaris - common
Scutellaria galericulata - common
Scutellaria hastifolia
Stachys palustris - common
Stachys recta - introduced, rare
Stachys sylvatica - common
Thymus ovatus - rare
Thymus serpyllum - common

Lentibulariaceae
Pinguicula vulgaris - extinct
Utricularia australis - rare
Utricularia intermedia
Utricularia minor
Utricularia ochroleuca - rare
Utricularia vulgaris - common

Linaceae
Linum catharticum
Linum usitatissimum - introduced, common

Lobeliaceae
Lobelia dortmanna

Lythraceae
Lythrum intermedium
Lythrum salicaria - common
Peplis portula

Malvaceae
Malva pusilla - introduced, rare
Tilia cordata

Menyanthaceae
Menyanthes trifoliata - common

Myricaceae
Myrica gale

Myrsinaceae
Centunculus minimus - rare
Glaux maritima
Lysimachia nummularia - rare
Lysimachia vulgaris - common
Naumburgia thyrsiflora - common
Trientalis europaea - common

Nymphaeaceae
Nuphar lutea - common
Nuphar pumila
Nymphaea candida - common
Nymphaea tetragona - rare

Oleaceae
Fraxinus excelsior

Onagraceae
Chamaenerion angustifolium - common
Circaea alpina
Epilobium adenocaulon - introduced, common
Epilobium bergianum - introduced, rare
Epilobium collinum
Epilobium hirsutum - common
Epilobium montanum - common
Epilobium obscurum - extinct
Epilobium palustre - common
Epilobium pseudorubescens - introduced, common
Epilobium roseum - common
Oenothera rubricaulis

Orobanchaceae
Euphrasia brevipila - common
Euphrasia fennica - common
Euphrasia glabrescens - common
Euphrasia hirtella - rare
Euphrasia parviflora - common
Euphrasia vernalis - common
Lathraea squamaria - rare
Melampyrum cristatum - rare
Melampyrum nemorosum - common
Melampyrum pratense - common
Melampyrum sylvaticum - common
Odontites litoralis
Odontites vulgaris - common
Pedicularis kaufmannii - rare
Pedicularis palustris - common
Pedicularis sceptrum-carolinum - rare
Rhinanthus minor - common
Rhinanthus serotinus - common

Oxalidaceae
Oxalis acetosella - common

Papaveraceae
Chelidonium majus - introduced, common
Papaver rhoeas - introduced, rare

Parnassiaceae
Parnassia palustris

Plantaginaceae
Callitriche cophocarpa - common
Callitriche hermaphroditica
Callitriche palustris - common
Chaenorhinum minus - introduced, rare
Hippuris vulgaris - common
Linaria genistifolia - introduced, rare
Littorella uniflora - rare
Plantago lanceolata - common
Plantago major - common
Plantago maritima
Plantago media - common
Veronica anagallis-aquatica - rare
Veronica arvensis - introduced
Veronica beccabunga
Veronica chamaedrys - common
Veronica longifolia - common
Veronica officinalis - common
Veronica scutellata - common
Veronica serpyllifolia - common
Veronica spicata - rare
Veronica verna - common

Plumbaginaceae
Armeria vulgaris - rare

Polemoniaceae
Polemonium caeruleum

Polygalaceae
Polygala amarella
Polygala vulgaris

Polygonaceae
Bistorta vivipara
Fagopyrum tataricum - introduced, rare
Fallopia convolvulus - introduced, common
Fallopia dumetorum
Persicaria amphibia - common
Persicaria foliosa - rare
Persicaria hydropiper - common
Persicaria lapathifolia - common
Persicaria maculosa
Persicaria minor - common
Persicaria mitis - rare
Persicaria scabra - introduced, common
Polygonum arenastrum - introduced, common
Polygonum aviculare - common
Polygonum boreale - rare
Polygonum calcatum - introduced, common
Polygonum neglectum - common
Polygonum oxyspermum - rare
Polygonum rurivagum - introduced, rare
Rumex acetosa - common
Rumex acetosella - common
Rumex aquaticus - common
Rumex confertus - introduced, rare
Rumex crispus - common
Rumex hydrolapathum - common
Rumex longifolius - introduced, common
Rumex maritimus
Rumex pseudonatronatus - introduced, rare
Rumex stenophyllus - introduced, rare
Rumex sylvestris - common
Rumex thyrsiflorus - common
Rumex triangulivalvis - introduced, rare

Portulacaceae
Montia fontana
Portulaca oleracea - introduced

Primulaceae
Androsace filiformis - rare
Androsace septentrionalis
Hottonia palustris - rare
Primula veris - rare

Ranunculaceae
Aconitum lycoctonum
Actaea spicata
Anemone nemorosa - common
Anemone ranunculoides
Batrachium circinatum
Batrachium dichotomum - common
Batrachium eradicatum - rare
Batrachium floribundum - rare
Batrachium kauffmannii - common
Batrachium marinum
Batrachium nevense - rare
Batrachium penicillatum - rare
Caltha palustris - common
Consolida regalis -introduced, rare
Ficaria verna
Hepatica nobilis
Myosurus minimus - introduced
Pulsatilla patens
Pulsatilla pratensis
Pulsatilla vernalis
Ranunculus acris - common
Ranunculus auricomus - common
Ranunculus bulbosus - rare
Ranunculus cassubicus
Ranunculus fallax - common
Ranunculus flammula - common
Ranunculus lingua
Ranunculus polyanthemos - common
Ranunculus repens - common
Ranunculus reptans - common
Ranunculus sceleratus - common
Ranunculus subborealis - rare
Thalictrum aquilegiifolium - rare
Thalictrum flavum - common
Thalictrum lucidum - rare
Thalictrum minus - introduced, rare
Thalictrum simplex - rare

Rhamnaceae
Frangula alnus - common
Rhamnus cathartica - rare

Rosaceae
Agrimonia eupatoria - rare
Agrimonia pilosa - rare
Alchemilla acutangula - common
Alchemilla baltica - common
Alchemilla cymatophylla - rare
Alchemilla filicaulis - rare
Alchemilla glabra - rare
Alchemilla glabricaulis - rare
Alchemilla glaucescens - rare
Alchemilla glomerulans - rare
Alchemilla hirsuticaulis - common
Alchemilla micans - common
Alchemilla monticola - common
Alchemilla murbeckiana - rare
Alchemilla obtusa - rare
Alchemilla plicata - rare
Alchemilla propinqua - rare
Alchemilla sarmatica
Alchemilla subcrenata - common
Alchemilla xanthochlora - introduced, rare
Comarum palustre - common
Filipendula denudata - common
Filipendula ulmaria - common
Filipendula vulgaris - rare
Fragaria moschata - common
Fragaria vesca - common
Geum aleppicum - introduced
Geum rivale - common
Geum urbanum - common
Potentilla anserina - common
Potentilla argentea - common
Potentilla bifurca - introduced, rare
Potentilla canescens - rare
Potentilla erecta - common
Potentilla goldbachii - common
Potentilla intermedia - common
Potentilla norvegica - common
Potentilla ruthenica - introduced, rare
Potentilla supina - introduced, rare
Potentilla verna - rare
Prunus padus - common
Rosa majalis - common
Rubus arcticus
Rubus caesius - introduced, rare
Rubus chamaemorus - common
Rubus idaeus - common
Rubus nessensis
Rubus saxatilis - common
Sorbus aucuparia - common

Rubiaceae
Galium album - common
Galium aparine - introduced, common
Galium boreale - common
Galium hercynicum - rare
Galium mollugo - rare
Galium odoratum - rare
Galium palustre - common
Galium trifidum - common
Galium triflorum - rare
Galium uliginosum - common
Galium vaillantii - introduced, common
Galium verum - common

Salicaceae
Populus tremula - common
Salix acutifolia
Salix aurita - common
Salix caprea - common
Salix cinerea - common
Salix lapponum
Salix myrsinifolia - common
Salix myrtilloides
Salix pentandra - common
Salix phylicifolia - common
Salix rosmarinifolia
Salix starkeana - common
Salix triandra - common
Salix viminalis - rare

Santalaceae
Thesium arvense - introduced, rare

Saxifragaceae
Chrysosplenium alternifolium - common
Saxifraga cespitosa - rare
Saxifraga hirculus

Scrophulariaceae
Limosella aquatica
Scrophularia nodosa - common
Verbascum nigrum - common
Verbascum thapsus

Solanaceae
Hyoscyamus niger - introduced
Solanum dulcamara - common
Solanum nigrum - introduced, rare

Thymelaeaceae
Daphne mezereum

Ulmaceae
Ulmus glabra
Ulmus laevis

Urticaceae
Urtica dioica - common
Urtica urens - introduced

Valerianaceae
Valeriana officinalis - common
Valeriana salina
Valeriana sambucifolia

Violaceae
Viola arvensis - introduced, common
Viola canina - common
Viola epipsila - common
Viola mirabilis
Viola nemoralis - common
Viola palustris - common
Viola persicifolia - rare
Viola riviniana - common
Viola rupestris
Viola selkirkii
Viola tricolor - common
Viola uliginosa

References
Доронина А. Ю. Сосудистые растения Карельского перешейка (Ленинградская область). [Doronina A. Vascular plants of the Karelian Isthmus (Leningrad Region)] Moscow: КМК, 2007. .
Иллюстрированный определитель растений Ленинградской области / Под ред. А. Л. Буданцева, Г. П. Яковлева. Moscow: КМК, 2006. .
Иллюстрированный определитель растений Карельского перешейка / Под ред. А. Л. Буданцева, Г. П. Яковлева. – СПб: СпецЛит, 2000.

Karelian Isthmus
Flora of Russia
Flora of Finland
Flora of Europe
Lists of plants
Lists of biota of Russia
Lists of biota of Finland
Holarctic flora